"All Sparks" is a song by British post-punk revival band Editors from their 2005 debut album, The Back Room. It was released 27 March 2006 as the fourth single from the album.

An acoustic version of the song features on the Radio 1's Live Lounge album. The song was also used as the closing theme to the first season of the ITV1 show Primeval.

Track listings
 7-inch (SKX84)
 "All Sparks"
 "Someone Says" (acoustic)

 CD (SKCD84)
 "All Sparks"
 "The Diplomat"

 Maxi-CD (SKCD842)
 "All Sparks"
 "From the Outside"
 "All Sparks" (Cicada remix)
 "All Sparks" (video)

 European Pias CD EP (449.3022.021)
 "All Sparks"
 "Come Share the View"
 "Find Yourself a Safe Place"
 "Time to Slow Down"
 "French Disko"

References

2005 songs
2006 singles
Editors (band) songs
Song recordings produced by Jim Abbiss
Songs written by Chris Urbanowicz
Songs written by Edward Lay
Songs written by Russell Leetch
Songs written by Tom Smith (musician)